Diana E. Northup is an American microbiologist, speleologist, ecologist, Visiting Professor of Biology, and Professor Emerita of Library Sciences with the University of New Mexico. Her research focuses on the microbial ecology of caves around the world. Dr. Northup is a Fellow of the National Speleological Society and the Cave Research Foundation. She wrote the Wiley textbook Microbial Ecology. She was awarded the National Speleological Society Science Prize in 2013.

Early life and education 
Northup was an undergraduate student at West Virginia University, where she studied political science. She moved to the University of Illinois Urbana-Champaign for graduate studies, where she earned a Master's of Library Science in 1972. Northup moved to the University of New Mexico, where she earned a Master's degree in biology in 1988. She remained at the University of New Mexico for her doctoral research, where she studied the geomicrobiology of caves.

Research and career 
Northup joined the faculty at the University of New Mexico. At the UNM she started the Subsurface Life In Mineral Environments (SLIME) team. In particular, Northup studies the colourful ferromanganese deposits that line the walls of Lechuguilla and Spider Cave in Carlsbad Caverns National Park. Her work on the Lechuguilla Cave was featured in a PBS Nova episode, "The Mysterious Life of Caves." She is also interested in the hydrogen sulphide cave ('Cueva de las Sardinas') in Tabasco.

Northup was elected Fellow of the National Speleological Society in 1992, and awarded their Science Prize in 2013.

Selected publications

Books

References 

Living people
Speleologists
University of New Mexico faculty
University of New Mexico alumni
Geomicrobiologists
Women microbiologists
Geochemists
Year of birth missing (living people)